North Street Historic District may refer to:

North Street Historic District (Burlington, Vermont), listed on the National Register of Historic Places (NRHP) in Chittenden County
North Street Historic District (New Martinsville, West Virginia), NRHP-listed in Wetzel County

See also
N Street (disambiguation)